is a railway station on the Kyūshū Railway Company (JR Kyūshū) Chikuhō Main Line (also known as the Wakamatsu Line) in Wakamatsu-ku, Kitakyushu, Fukuoka Prefecture, Japan.

Station layout

History
Japanese National Railways (JNR) opened the station on 6 November 1953 as an additional temporary stop on the existing Chikuho Main Line track. On 1 November 1962, it was upgraded to a full station. With the privatization of JNR on 1 April 1987, control of the station passed to JR Kyushu.

On 4 March 2017, Oku-Dōkai, along with several other stations on the line, became a "Smart Support Station".

Surrounding area
It is the westernmost train station among four stations in Wakamatsu-ku, all of those are on the Chikuho Main Line. National Route 199 runs immediately north of the station. Other points of interest include:
 Wakamatsu Boat Racing - 200m south
 Best Denki Wakamatsu-nishi store - 400m east
 Higashi Futajima Post office - 500m west

References

Railway stations in Fukuoka Prefecture
Buildings and structures in Kitakyushu
Railway stations in Japan opened in 1962